Matthew Wood Green (1840 – 29 September 1914) was a 19th-century Member of Parliament from Dunedin, New Zealand.

References

|-

Members of the New Zealand House of Representatives
1840 births
1914 deaths
New Zealand MPs for Dunedin electorates
Unsuccessful candidates in the 1884 New Zealand general election
19th-century New Zealand politicians